Rajiv Gandhi Thermal Power Station is located at Khedar village near Barwala in Hisar district of Haryana, India. The power plant is one of the coal based power plants of Haryana Power Generation Corporation Limited (HPGCL).

The Engineering, procurement and construction (EPC) contract was given to Reliance Infrastructure.

Power plant
The work for a 1,200 MW coal-fired power plant was awarded during 2007. The total estimated cost of the project is around ₹4,297 crores. The cost of ₹3.19 crore per MW for this project is lowest among all the Thermal power plants in India. Both the units 2x600 MW were commissioned.

Installed capacity

See also 

 Deenbandhu Chhotu Ram Thermal Power Station
 Panipat Thermal Power Station I
 Panipat Thermal Power Station II
 Faridabad Thermal Power Station

References 

Coal-fired power stations in Haryana
Buildings and structures in Hisar district
Energy infrastructure completed in 2010
2010 establishments in Haryana